Northington Down is a hamlet in the civil parish of Northington in the City of Winchester district of Hampshire, England.

Villages in Hampshire